Hopewell Municipal Building is a historic municipal building located at Hopewell, Virginia. It was built in 1925, and is a three-story, nine bay, rectangular, sandstone brick building in the Classical Revival style.  Attached to the main building is a three-story annex built in 1957.  The main entrance is a stone framed double door with a five pane transom window and a six foot deep portico with two stone unfluted columns on either side. The building houses city offices and the police department.

It was listed on the National Register of Historic Places in 1998.

References

City and town halls on the National Register of Historic Places in Virginia
Neoclassical architecture in Virginia
Government buildings completed in 1925
Buildings and structures in Hopewell, Virginia
National Register of Historic Places in Hopewell, Virginia